Pierluigi Conti (better known as Al Cliver) (born 16 July 1951) is a retired Italian actor who is perhaps best known for starring in horror and exploitation films, especially ones by directors Lucio Fulci and Jesús Franco.

Career
Cliver was discovered at the age of 16, he then started doing a few commercials and later at around the age of 22 he got into the world of Italian cinema. He decided to use the name Al Cliver as his stage name, as it was trendy for Italian actors at that time to use American stage names.  He decided on after Al Capone, or Al Pacino and his surname was taken from a death row prisoner who wrote a best selling book.

Cliver made his acting debut in 1974 in Il Saprofita.  He has starred in erotic, adventure and crime movies, but he is mostly memorable for starring in exploitation and horror films such as Lucio Fulci's Zombi 2, The Black Cat, The Beyond and Demonia, and Jesús Franco's Mondo Cannibale and Devil Hunter.

Personal life
Cliver was born Pierluigi Conti in Alexandria, Egypt. From 1975 to 1978, he was in a relationship with French actress Annie Belle and has acted alongside her in the films Forever Emmanuelle, Blue Belle, Velluto Nero and Un Giorno alla fine di Ottobre.  After their split they acted together in Molto di Più and L'Alcova.

Cliver was diagnosed with throat cancer in August 2008. He had to undergo surgery which has left him speaking strained in a mere whisper. He lives in Bali and is the owner and manager of holiday villas.

In 2018 Cliver's memoirs, Without Script were published.

Filmography

1969: Le 10 meraviglie dell'amore
1969: The Damned - SS Soldier (uncredited)
1974: Il Saprofita - Servant
1975: Waves of Lust - Irem
1976: Forever Emmanuelle - Nicola
1976: Blue Belle - Philip
1976: Amore Grande, - Amore Libero - Marco
1976: Il Colpaccio - Mark Lemon
1976: Velluto Nero - Horatio
1976: Mister Scarface - Rick
1976: Apache Woman - Tommy
1977: Un Giorno alla fine di Ottobre
1977: Death Hunt - Inspector Ettore Moretti
1978: Provincia Violenta - Roberto Mauri
1978: Milano... Difendersi o Morire - Domino
1979: Zombi 2 - Brian Hull
1979: L'Alberto della Maldicenza - Franco
1980: Flying Sex - Roman Tracy
1980: Molto di Più
1980: Mondo Cannibale - Jeremy Taylor
1980: Devil Hunter - Peter Weston
1981: The Black Cat - Sgt. Wilson
1981: The Beyond - Dr. Harris
1982: 2020 Texas Gladiators - Nisus
1983: Spy Connection - Boris, the torturer (uncredited)
1983: I Paladini - Storia d'Armi e D'Amori - Selvaggio (credited as Pierluigi Conti)
1983: I Briganti
1983: Endgame - Ron Shannon
1984: Warriors of the Year 2072 - Kirk
1984: Murder Rock - Voice Analyst (uncredited)
1984: L'Alcova - Elio De Silveris
1985: La piovra,  (TV Mini-Series) - Fiorito (credited as Pierluigi Conti)
1986: Lussuria - Roberto
1986: Le Miniere del Kilimangiaro - British Governor's Aide
1987: Laura Oggetto Sessuale - Marcello
1988: Touch of Death - Randy (credited as Pier Luigi Conti)
1988: Il Fantasma di Sodoma (TV Movie) - Drunken Nazi (uncredited)
1989: La Casa nel Tempo (TV Movie) - Peter
1990: Demonia - Porter (credited as Al Clever) (final film role)
2004: Building a Better Zombi (video documentary) - Himself
2008: Paura: Lucio Fulci Remembered - Volume 1 (video documentary) - Himself
2011: Mondo Holocausto! - Geoffrey Daniels

References

External links
 

1951 births
Italian male film actors
Living people
People from Alexandria